Divekar College of Commerce was started in 1970 to impart undergraduate commerce education at karwar and surrounding area.

The first Principal G.V. Bhat has played a major role to make this college a reputed educational center from start of college in 1970 until his retirement in 1993.

Divekar College of Commerce, Karwar of the Kanara Welfare Trust is a Commerce college affiliated to Karnatak University Dharwad.

List of Principals

Shri G V Bhat
Founder Principal
15-06-1970 to 31-10-1993	
 
Shri S N Nayak
01-11-1993 to 31-05-2000

Shri M S Habbu
01-06-2000 to 31-10-2002

Shri P M Rane
01-11-2002 to 30-11-2002

Shri. R S Habbu
01-12-2002 to 31-01-2005
	
Shri. Y B Bandi
01-02-2005 to 30-09-2008

Dr. R G Gundi
01-10-2008 to 31-03-2013	
 
Dr. S D Naik
01-04-2013 to 31-05-2013

Dr. M H Naik
01-06-2013 to 31-04-2016 	

Dr. B.H. Nayak
01-05-2016 to 30-06-2019
 
Dr. Keshava K. G.
01-07-2019 to Present

References
 Kanara Welfare trust 

Colleges in Karnataka
Educational institutions established in 1970
Education in Karwar